Mariano Peña García (born 7 April 1960) is a Spanish regular and voice actor, mostly known for his role as Mauricio Colmenero in Aída and Benito Benjumea in Allí abajo.

References

External links

People from Huelva
1960 births
21st-century Spanish male actors
Living people
Spanish male actors